Aitona is a municipality in the comarca of Segrià in Catalonia, Spain. Its population is 2,523 by 2016. Its main industry is the agriculture.

References

External links
 Government data pages 

Municipalities in Segrià
Populated places in Segrià